Marlo Marcheco (born March 8, 1963) is a Cuban sprint canoer who competed in the early 1990s. At the 1992 Summer Olympics in Barcelona, he was eliminated in the semifinals of the K-2 1000 m event. Record holder of 10 gold medals in 2 Central American Games (1990-1993) k-1 1000m/ k-2 500/1000m/ k-4 200/1000m.

References
Sports-Reference.com profile

1963 births
Canoeists at the 1992 Summer Olympics
Cuban male canoeists
Living people
Olympic canoeists of Cuba